Ajay Pandey, also known as Ajay K. Pandey, is an Indian author of romance novels. His books include You are the Best Wife, You are the Best Friend, A Girl to Remember. His first book was You are the Best Wife.

Career
Pandey was born in Uttar Pradesh. He is an engineer of a Pune-based company, Cognizant. His first book as an author was You are the Best Wife which was released in 2015. After the success of this book, he wrote Her Last Wish.

Books
You are the Best Wife
You are the Best Friend
Her Last Wish
A Girl to Remember
An Unexpected Gift
Everything I never told you
The girl in the red lipstick
I Wish I Could Tell Her

References

Indian male writers
Living people
Writers from Uttar Pradesh
Year of birth missing (living people)